Brian Fallon is an American singer, songwriter, and guitarist.

Brian Fallon may also refer to:

 Brian Fallon (critic) (born 1933), Irish art critic
 Brian Fallon (press secretary), press secretary for the 2016 Hillary Clinton presidential campaign